100 Summer Street is a high-rise building located in downtown Boston, Massachusetts. It is ranked 24th on the list of tallest buildings in Boston. The building is notable for the distinctive bronze tint of its windows. It was designed in a U-shaped footprint to accommodate a small public plaza. Welton Becket and Associates was the architect.

In 1998, EQ Office acquired the building. In 2019 it was sold to the Rockpoint Group.

Notable tenants
 Bloomberg L.P.
 Bullhorn, Inc.
 CloudHealth Technologies
 DebtX
 EverBank
 Game Show Network
 Geode Capital Management
 Google
 InvenSense
 NantHealth
 Nixon Peabody
 Rapid7
 State Farm
 State Street Corporation
 VMware

In popular culture
In the CW television show Arrowverse, 100 Summer Street is shown as the fictional headquarters of Oliver Queen's company, Queen Consolidated (later Palmer Technologies).

Gallery

See also

List of tallest buildings in Boston

References

External links

 Entry on Emporis
 Entry on SkyscraperPage
 Entry on EQ Office

Skyscraper office buildings in Boston
Office buildings completed in 1974
Welton Becket buildings